Statue of Bee Gees may refer to:

Statue of Bee Gees (Douglas, Isle of Man)
Statue of Bee Gees (Redcliffe, Queensland)